Elections to Mole Valley Council were held on 3 May 2007. One third of the council was up for election and the Conservative Party kept overall control of the council. Overall turnout was 46.5%.

After the election, the composition of the council was:
Conservative 22
Liberal Democrat 16
Independent 3

Election result

Ward results

References
2007 Mole Valley election result
Ward results

2007
2007 English local elections
2000s in Surrey